Homalia is a genus of mosses in the family Neckeraceae.

References

Neckeraceae
Moss genera